Jennett is both a surname and a given name. Notable people with the name include:

Bryan Jennett (1926–2008), pioneering professor of neurosurgery in Glasgow
Seán Jennett (1912–1981), author of many travel books, typographer for Faber and Faber
Jennett Humphreys (1829–1917), English author, poet, and contributor to major reference works
Leonard Jennett Simpson (1882–1940), physician and political figure in Ontario

See also
Jeanetta (disambiguation)
Jeanette (disambiguation)
JenNet-IP
Jennet